The New South Wales Open is an annual golf tournament held in New South Wales, Australia. The event was founded in 1931 as the New South Wales Close Championship, being restricted to residents of New South Wales, becoming the New South Wales Open Championship in 1958 when it was opened up to players from outside New South Wales. Norman Von Nida won the event six times, while Jim Ferrier and Frank Phillips won it five times with Greg Norman winning it four times.

History
The event was founded in 1931 as the New South Wales Close Championship, being restricted to residents of New South Wales. The first event was held at Manly Golf Club and, after 72 holes played over two days, resulted in a tie between three professionals Charlie Gray, Tom Howard and Sam Richardson. Gray won the title after a 36-hole playoff scoring 147 to Howard's 148. Richardson took 80 in the first round and didn't complete the 36 holes. Richardson won in 1932 but the remainder of the 1930s were dominated by Jim Ferrier who won five times and was runner-up twice between 1933 and 1939. Three times he won by 10 or more strokes.

Norman Von Nida won in 1939 and then again from 1946 to 1948, to repeat Ferrier record of four successive wins. In 1951 a New South Wales Jubilee Open was organised, the state's first open championship, to celebrate the 50th anniversary of the founding of the Federation of Australia. The tournament was won by Dai Rees while Kel Nagle was runner-up and won the Close title. Von Nida won the Close championship again in 1953 and 1954, setting a record of six championship wins. The 1955 event clashed with the first Pelaco Tournament in Melbourne, an event which attracted all the leading New South Wales professionals.

In 1958 the championship was opened up to players from outside New South Wales, becoming the New South Wales Open Championship. Peter Thomson from Victoria won in 1961. Two amateur's won in the 1970s, Owen Beldham in 1972 and Tony Gresham in 1975, while American Ed Sneed won in 1973.

The tournament continued to be a major event in the 1980s. Greg Norman won three times in the decade and the 1989 event had prize money of A$300,000. The event then struggled for a number of years. The 1990 championship had prize money of A$50,000 and there was no event in 1991. In 1992 it had increased prize money of A$150,000 but there was again no event the following year. It returned in 1994 on the second-tier Foundation Tour with prize money of A$50,000 and was then not played again until 2002, when it returned with prize money of A$200,000.

From 2003 to 2008 the event was part of the second-tier Von Nida Tour, while from 2009 to 2015 it was a Tier 2 event on the PGA Tour of Australasia schedule. In 2016 it became a Tier 1 event with prize money of A$400,000 compared to the A$110,000 in 2015.

Winners

Notes

References

External links
Official site
Coverage on PGA Tour of Australasia's official site

PGA Tour of Australasia events
Golf tournaments in Australia
Golf in New South Wales
Recurring sporting events established in 1931
1931 establishments in Australia